Mauro Matos (born 6 August 1982 in Castelli) is a retired Argentine football striker.

Career

Matos emerged from the lower leagues of Argentine football in 2008 when he joined Arsenal de Sarandí of the Argentine Primera from Deportivo Armenio. He made his top flight debut on 16 August 2006 against Tigre and made a total of 30 Primera División appearances for the club. He also played in Club Atletico Chascomus for a short period.

In January 2010 Matos left Arsenal to join All Boys of the 2nd division.

Honours
San Lorenzo
Copa Libertadores: 2014

References

External links
 
 
 Mauro Matos at BDFA.com.ar 
 Argentine Primera statistics at Fútbol XXI  
 

1982 births
Living people
Sportspeople from Buenos Aires Province
Argentine footballers
Argentine expatriate footballers
All Boys footballers
San Luis F.C. players
Arsenal de Sarandí footballers
Asociación Social y Deportiva Justo José de Urquiza players
Newell's Old Boys footballers
Deportivo Armenio footballers
San Lorenzo de Almagro footballers
Club de Gimnasia y Esgrima La Plata footballers
Chacarita Juniors footballers
Atlético Tucumán footballers
Barracas Central players
Argentine Primera División players
Primera Nacional players
Liga MX players
Argentine expatriate sportspeople in Mexico
Expatriate footballers in Mexico
Association football forwards